Thomas McDonald (born 18 September 1992) is a professional Australian rules footballer playing for the Melbourne Football Club in the Australian Football League (AFL).  tall and weighing , McDonald is a key position player who can play both forward and defence. He spent his final junior year playing in the TAC Cup for the North Ballarat Rebels and played top-level football when he played two matches for North Ballarat in the Victorian Football League (VFL). He was recruited by the Melbourne Football Club with the fifty-third overall selection in the 2010 AFL draft and made his AFL debut during the 2011 season. His second year saw him earn a Rising Star nomination playing in Melbourne's backline, and finished sixth overall. He has since become Melbourne's main key defender and has finished in the top ten of the club's best and fairest in every season he's played, apart from 2011 where he played just two matches.

Early life
Growing up in Edenhope, Victoria, McDonald attended Edenhope College before moving to Ballarat to board at St Patrick's College for year twelve. He played for the North Ballarat Rebels in the TAC Cup in 2010 as a key forward and played two matches for the North Ballarat Football Club seniors in the Victorian Football League (VFL) in mid-2010.

AFL career

2011–2014: Early career
McDonald was recruited by the Melbourne Football Club with their fourth selection and fifty-third overall in the 2010 national draft. After playing in the 2011 NAB Cup, he spent the majority of the season playing in the Victorian Football League (VFL) for Melbourne's affiliate team, the Casey Scorpions. He made his AFL debut in the thirty point win against  at the Melbourne Cricket Ground in round twenty-three where he recorded eighteen disposals, six marks, six rebound-50s and four tackles, playing as a backman, and he was named in the best players by AFL Media and The Age. He maintained his spot in the team the next week for the final match of the year in the eight point loss against  at the Adelaide Oval, to finish with two matches for the year.

He spent the season playing as the full back where he played on some of the competitions best full-forwards including 's Nick Riewoldt, 's Tom Hawkins and 's Travis Cloke. After playing on Jonathon Patton in the seventy-eight point win against  at the Melbourne Cricket Ground in round thirteen he was named the round nominee for the Rising Star where he recorded twenty-six disposals, four marks and three tackles. He missed his first match of the year in round fifteen after he suffered from a bleeding lung as a result of a collision during the sixty-one point loss against  the previous week. He returned for the round sixteen match against  at Etihad Stadium and played the remainder of the year to finish with twenty matches for the season. His performances during the year earned him a third-place finish in Melbourne's best and fairest count, behind Nathan Jones and Jack Grimes, and the Harold Ball Memorial Trophy as Melbourne's best young player. Furthermore, he finished sixth in the Rising Star award.

After the departure of defender, Jared Rivers, McDonald played a more prominent role in Melbourne's backline during the 2013 season. He played his first match of the year in the 148-point loss against  at the Melbourne Cricket Ground in round two and played the next four matches before missing four weeks due to a shoulder injury. He returned to the side for the eighty-three point loss against  in the annual Queen's Birthday clash in round eleven. He did not miss a match for the remainder of the season to finish with seventeen matches for the year and a tenth-place finish in Melbourne's best and fairest count.

The 2014 season saw McDonald play in round one for the first time in his career when he played in the seventeen point loss against  at Etihad Stadium. He played his fiftieth AFL match in the thirty-three point loss against Collingwood in the Queen's Birthday match in round twelve. After playing every match up to round fourteen, he was forced to miss the round fifteen match due to a calf injury, but returned the next week for the sixty-three point loss against Fremantle at TIO Stadium. In the final round match against , he kicked his first and second career goals within a minute of each other, both were set up in near identical ways, with McDonald marking inside fifty after teammate, Dean Kent kicked to him. He played twenty-one matches for the season, resulting in a seventh-place finish in Melbourne's best and fairest.

2015–2016: Emergence as the main defender at Melbourne

After introducing a more offensive style into the way his game, McDonald opened the 2015 AFL season with a team-high twenty-six disposals in the twenty-six point win against Gold Coast and was named in the best players. The departure of James Frawley, saw McDonald emerge as the number one defender at Melbourne and he was highly praised in the first half of the season where he was compared to the 2014 All-Australian centre half-back, Alex Rance, with Herald Sun journalist, Sam Landsberger debating whether McDonald's season was better than Rance's. He was labelled as Melbourne's most improved player and was named as a potential All-Australian. After his direct opponent, Travis Cloke, kicked seven goals in the Queen's Birthday clash, McDonald found himself lose form and he was moved into the forward line to help regain his confidence. He spent the second half of the year playing in both the forward and back line, which drew the praise of both then-senior coach Paul Roos and backline coach, Jade Rawlings, for his versatility. He played every match for the year, which earned him a third-place finish in Melbourne's best and fairest.

On the eve of the 2016 season, McDonald was named in Melbourne's leadership group. Due to finish the season out-of-contract, speculation surrounded his season as to whether he would re-sign with the club. He ultimately re-signed with the club in August on a two-year deal, tying him to Melbourne until the end of the 2018 season. The round sixteen match against  at TIO Stadium in a thirty-two point win saw McDonald record a career-high thirty-one disposals, ten marks, and six rebound-50s, which earned him the centre half-back position in AFL Media's team of the week. He played his 100th AFL match in the two-point win against Gold Coast at the Melbourne Cricket Ground in round nineteen. He played every match during the year and finished sixth in Melbourne's best and fairest count.

2017–Present: Melbourne's key forward, leading goalkicker
Following Max Gawn's early season hamstring injury, McDonald was redeployed as a back-up ruckman to assist the undersized Cameron Pedersen. McDonald  also played as a wingman, where he could apply his elite running capacity. Playing in this role, McDonald was awarded three Brownlow votes for amassing 26 disposals, twelve marks and a goal against the Essendon Bombers in round 5. With the loss of key forward Jesse Hogan due to health issues, McDonald was later moved forward during the second half of Melbourne's upset victory against the Adelaide Crows where he kicked two early goals in the third quarter as Melbourne defeated the Crows by 41 points. McDonald's move forward eventuated in a match winning performance against the West Coast Eagles round 14 where McDonald kicked five goals, including the matchwinner; a miraculous snap in the dying seconds as he was tackled by Jeremy McGovern. McDonald finished with 23 goals for the season after kicking eight in total during his previous six seasons at the club, with his contested marking and aerobic capacity demonstrating that he could play as a key forward despite playing as a defender for his career to date.

Following his breakout in the forward line during the previous season, it was believed that McDonald would continue in his newfound role while assisting in the ruck when required. However, a niggling toe injury during the following pre-season kept McDonald sidelined for the opening five rounds of the 2018 AFL season, before he finally returned with two goals and 16 disposals in a 36 point win against Essendon. In a six week streak between rounds 6 and 11 where Melbourne won all of their matches, McDonald made a successful and dynamic return to Melbourne's forward half, highlighted by a 24 touch, four goals best on ground performance against the Western Bulldogs in Round 11. During the 2018 Queen's Birthday match, McDonald kicked a career high six goals as Melbourne lost to Collingwood by 42 points. Mid-way through the season, McDonald signed with the Demons for a further four years. By the end of the season, Melbourne qualified for their first finals campaign in 12 years. McDonald played a key role in Melbourne's 33 point Semi-Final win against Hawthorn, kicking a match high four goals as Melbourne triumphed to the tune of 33 points. Following Melbourne's loss to West Coast in the preliminary final the following week, McDonald had amassed a total of 53 goals for the season, the most since any Melbourne player since Brad Green's 55 goal haul in 2010.

Views and personal life
In 2021 McDonald commented that he thought it was ‘ethically wrong’ for the AFL to mandate that AFL players be vaccinated against COVID to play. He subsequently was criticised by some in the media for this view.

McDonald has previously appeared on a podcast for the right-wing think tank, the Institute of Public Affairs.

Statistics
Updated to the end of the 2022 season.

|-
| 2011 ||  || 43
| 2 || 0 || 1 || 16 || 12 || 28 || 9 || 4 || 0.0 || 0.5 || 8.0 || 6.0 || 14.0 || 4.5 || 2.0 || 0
|- 
| 2012 ||  || 25
| 20 || 0 || 1 || 161 || 171 || 332 || 94 || 40 || 0.0 || 0.1 || 8.1 || 8.6 || 16.6 || 4.7 || 2.0 || 0
|-
| 2013 ||  || 25
| 17 || 0 || 1 || 142 || 134 || 276 || 72 || 34 || 0.0 || 0.1 || 8.4 || 7.9 || 16.2 || 4.2 || 2.0 || 0
|-
| 2014 ||  || 25
| 21 || 2 || 0 || 195 || 118 || 313 || 101 || 35 || 0.1 || 0.0 || 9.3 || 5.6 || 14.9 || 4.8 || 1.7 || 0
|-
| 2015 ||  || 25
| 22 || 5 || 4 || 268 || 149 || 417 || 155 || 44 || 0.2 || 0.2 || 12.2 || 6.8 || 19.0 || 7.0 || 2.0 || 0
|-
| 2016 ||  || 25
| 22 || 1 || 0 || 258 || 155 || 413 || 148 || 36 || 0.0 || 0.0 || 11.7 || 7.0 || 18.8 || 6.7 || 1.6 || 0
|-
| 2017 ||  || 25
| 22 || 23 || 7 || 227 || 161 || 388 || 139 || 50 || 1.0 || 0.3 || 10.3 || 7.3 || 17.6 || 6.3 || 2.3 || 9
|-
| 2018 ||  || 25
| 20 || 53 || 20 || 189 || 121 || 310 || 134 || 47 || 2.7 || 1.0 || 9.5 || 6.1 || 15.5 || 6.7 || 2.4 || 4
|-
| 2019 ||  || 25
| 15 || 18 || 15 || 128 || 77 || 205 || 65 || 23 || 1.2 || 1.0 || 8.5 || 5.1 || 13.7 || 4.3 || 1.5 || 6
|-
| 2020 ||  || 25
| 9 || 7 || 1 || 50 || 27 || 77 || 29 || 16 || 0.8 || 0.1 || 5.5 || 3.0 || 8.5 || 3.2 || 1.7 || 0
|-
| scope=row bgcolor=F0E68C | 2021# ||  || 25
| 23 || 33 || 22 || 217 || 105 || 322 || 122 || 51 || 1.4 || 1.0 || 9.4 || 4.6 || 14.0 || 5.3 || 2.2 || 8
|-
| 2022 ||  || 25
| 9 || 15 || 10 || 66 || 31 || 97 || 36 || 10 || 1.7 || 1.1 || 7.3 || 3.4 || 10.8 || 4.0 || 1.1 || 2
|- class=sortbottom
! colspan=3 | Career
! 202 !! 157 !! 82 !! 1917 !! 1261 !! 3178 !! 1104 !! 389 !! 0.8 !! 0.4 !! 9.5 !! 6.2 !! 15.7 !! 5.5 !! 1.9 !! 29
|}

Notes

Honours and achievements
Team
 AFL premiership player: 2021
 McClelland Trophy: 2021

Individual
 Melbourne leading goalkicker: 2018
 Harold Ball Memorial Trophy: 2012
 AFL Rising Star nominee: 2012 (Round 13)

External links

References

1992 births
Living people
Australian rules footballers from Victoria (Australia)
Melbourne Football Club players
Greater Western Victoria Rebels players
North Ballarat Football Club players
Casey Demons players
People educated at St Patrick's College, Ballarat
Melbourne Football Club Premiership players
One-time VFL/AFL Premiership players